Gerrit Müller (born 26 April 1984) is a German professional footballer who plays as a midfielder for 1. FC Magdeburg. He is under contract until June 2018.

References

External links

Homepage
Gerrit Müller at Kicker

1984 births
Living people
Footballers from Baden-Württemberg
Association football midfielders
German footballers
VfB Stuttgart II players
Karlsruher SC II players
Sportfreunde Siegen players
Dynamo Dresden players
1. FC Heidenheim players
Stuttgarter Kickers players
1. FC Magdeburg players
3. Liga players